The 1997 Meta Styrian Open was a women's tennis tournament played on outdoor clay courts at the Sportpark Piberstein in Maria Lankowitz in Austria that was part of Tier IV of the 1997 WTA Tour. It was the 25th edition of the tournament and was held from 28 July through 3 August 1997. Barbara Schett won the singles title.

Finals

Singles

 Barbara Schett defeated  Henrieta Nagyová 3–6, 6–2, 6–3
 It was Schett's 2nd title of the year and the 4th of her career.

Doubles

 Eva Melicharová /  Helena Vildová defeated  Radka Bobková /  Wiltrud Probst 6–2, 6–2
 It was Melicharova's 2nd title of the year and the 2nd of her career. It was Vildova's 2nd title of the year and the 2nd of her career.

External links
 ITF tournament edition details

Meta Styrian Open
WTA Austrian Open
WTA